Ryan Gibbons may refer to:

 Ryan Gibbons (American football) (born 1983), American football offensive lineman
 Ryan Gibbons (cyclist) (born 1994), South African cyclist